St Francis House was a home for inland Aboriginal Australian boys from 1946 to 1959 at Glanville Hall in Semaphore South, Adelaide, South Australia.

Father Percy Smith purchased Glanville Hall on behalf of the Anglican Church to provide accommodation for young Aboriginal boys from remote areas who were attending school in the local area. He founded the St Francis Boys' Home in order to bring boys down (including several from Alice Springs in the Northern Territory) for education and employment.

In a time when it was commonly believed that Aboriginal children were unable to be educated beyond Grade 3, Smith saw the home as a way of providing a family environment for the children to pursue a higher level of education without losing their Aboriginal identity. He described the hostel as “not one of fostering, but rather a boarding establishment to which boys came with their mothers' consent for the school year, and in that respect it was no different from children being sent by their parents to a boarding school".

The manor became known as "St Francis House: A Home for Inland Children" and over the next 14 years, more than 50 children found at home at St Francis on their way to greatness. Former residents include Charles Perkins , Gordon Briscoe , John Moriarty , Les Nayda , and Bill Espie (Queen's Medal for Bravery) and the artist 
Harold Thomas (activist) (Bundoo) who signed a $20m agreement with the Australian Government to secure the rights to the Aboriginal flag, meaning it can now be reproduced without a fee. Some notable sporting identities included Vincent Copley, Richie Bray and Ken Hampton went on to play football for Port Adelaide, while Wally McArthur became an accomplished track and field athlete as well as rugby player. Many other residents went on to lead successful and fulfilled lives.

Moriarty has said that St Francis House was an exceptional home. 

At St Francis House, the boys formed a strong, life-long bond with Smith and his wife, and with each other.

A history of St Francis House is being written by former Australian test cricketer Ashley Mallett.

The St Francis House Project was established in 2018 to document the history of the home.

Notable people
Some residents of St Francis House who later went on to forge sporting careers and/or became engaged in Indigenous activism include:

Winnie Branson
Gordon Briscoe
Malcolm Cooper
Vincent Copley
Wally McArthur
John Moriarty
Charlie Perkins

References

Further reading
 Part of a series "Kids from the Alice".

History of Adelaide
Aboriginal schools in South Australia
1946 establishments in Australia
Educational institutions established in 1946
1959 disestablishments in Australia
Educational institutions disestablished in 1959
Lefevre Peninsula